Jonathan Blake Holder (born June 9, 1993) is an American professional baseball pitcher in the Los Angeles Angels organization. He previously played in Major League Baseball (MLB) for the New York Yankees.

Career

Amateur
Holder attended Gulfport High School in Gulfport, Mississippi, and Mississippi State University, where he played college baseball for the Mississippi State Bulldogs from 2012 to 2014. During his career he had an 11–2 record, 1.59 earned run average (ERA), 191 strikeouts and a school record 37 saves. In 2012, he played collegiate summer baseball with the Wareham Gatemen of the Cape Cod Baseball League.

New York Yankees
Holder was drafted by the New York Yankees in the sixth round of the 2014 Major League Baseball draft. After pitching in relief in college, the Yankees converted him into a starting pitcher. He made his professional debut with the Gulf Coast Yankees of the Rookie-level Gulf Coast League and later played for the Staten Island Yankees of the Class A-Short Season New York-Penn League. He started 2015 with the Tampa Yankees of the Class A-Advanced Florida State League. He posted a 7–6 record with a 2.52 ERA. He began the 2016 season with Tampa and was promoted to the Trenton Thunder of the Class AA Eastern League on April 11. On April 26, 2016, Holder pitched the final inning of a joint no hitter that was started by Ronald Herrera. On July 21, the Yankees promoted Holder to the Scranton/Wilkes-Barre RailRiders of the Class AAA International League

The Yankees promoted Holder to the major leagues on September 2, 2016. In 8 appearances with the Yankees to finish 2016, Holder had a 5.40 ERA. His first major league strikeout came against Baltimore Orioles center fielder Adam Jones, striking him out on 3 pitches after quickly going ahead 0–2. On May 5, 2017, Holder got his first major league win pitching a scoreless inning of relief against the Chicago Cubs. In 37 appearances out of the bullpen, Holder finished the 2017 year 1–1 with a 3.89 ERA.

On August 2, 2018, Holder allowed seven runs without recording an out in a game against the Boston Red Sox. Holder became the second Yankees pitcher to ever post such a line after Bob Kammeyer did so on September 18, 1979. Holder finished the year with a solid 3.14 ERA in 66 innings pitched. He faltered in 2019 and 2020, however, as he had a 5.86 ERA in 63 innings in the two seasons despite an 8–2 record. On December 2, 2020, Holder was nontendered by the Yankees.

Chicago Cubs
On December 17, 2020, Holder signed a one-year, $750,000 contract with the Chicago Cubs. On April 26, 2021, Holder was placed on the 60-day injured list with a shoulder issue. Holder did not appear in a game for Chicago due to the injury and was outrighted off of the 40-man roster on November 3, 2021. He elected free agency the following day, but re-signed with the team on a minor league contract on November 19. He elected free agency on November 10, 2022.

Los Angeles Angels
On November 29, 2022, Holder signed a minor league deal with the Los Angeles Angels.

References

External links

Mississippi State Bulldogs bio

1993 births
Living people
Sportspeople from Gulfport, Mississippi
Baseball players from Mississippi
Major League Baseball pitchers
New York Yankees players
Mississippi State Bulldogs baseball players
Wareham Gatemen players
Gulf Coast Yankees players
Staten Island Yankees players
Tampa Yankees players
Scranton/Wilkes-Barre RailRiders players
Trenton Thunder players